Steven Eckholdt (born September 6, 1961) is an American actor. He has appeared in many television series and film roles. He is best known as Saun in The Runnin' Kind, Patrick Flannigan in L.A. Law, Mark Robinson in Friends, and Doug Westin in The West Wing.

Career

Television 
Eckholdt began his screen career in the mid-1980s. He began with appearances on TV shows like The Love Boat and 21 Jump Street. He landed recurring roles on WIOU (a short-lived CBS series in 1991) and Life Goes On.

Eckholdt's main screen appearances have included L.A. Law, Melrose Place, It's Like, You Know..., Providence, The West Wing and The L Word. His guest starring appearances include shows like Baywatch, Wings, and more.

Eckholdt played the role of Mark Robinson, a co-worker and later love interest of Rachel Green (played by Jennifer Aniston) in the sitcom Friends. He appeared in five episodes of Season 3 and one episode of the final season, Season 10.

His role in the 1997 TV pilot for the sitcom Dads is seen by test audiences at the Television Preview, a marketing research operation in which participants are told they are seeing a pilot for a new program.

Also in 1997, Eckholdt appeared in "The Puppy Episode" of the sitcom Ellen, and in The Practice.

In 2003, Eckholdt starred in the CBS television sitcom My Big Fat Greek Life which was based on the blockbuster comedy feature film, My Big Fat Greek Wedding. He starred as Thomas Miller, the character originally portrayed as Ian Miller by John Corbett in the movie version.

In 2010, he also appeared in the seventh season of Two and a Half Men as Brad, a charming lawyer who causes the breakup of Charlie and Chelsea.

Film 
In the 1986 film The Wraith, Eckholdt played the character George in the film's opening sequence.

He also starred as Peter Albright in Santa Who? (2000), a TV movie featuring Leslie Nielsen.

In 2003 he appeared in Secret Santa with Jennie Garth and Comfort and Joy with Nancy McKeon.

In 2008 he appeared in Our First Christmas with Julie Warner and Dixie Carter.

Other movie roles include Message in a Bottle (1999) and Arcadia (2012).

Filmography

Television

Film

References

External links

1961 births
American male film actors
American male television actors
Living people